Boobs in the Wood is a 1925 silent black and white short American film starring Harry Langdon directed by Harry Edwards and produced by Mack Sennett. It was Sennett's first film written by Arthur Ripley.

Alternative  titles included "Buzz Saw and Buckwheat" and "The Lumber Ox". The name is a pun on Babes in the Wood.

Plot
Chester walks through a forest of huge trees with a double-headed axe over his shoulder. He encounters Big Bill Reardon, the boss, organising the felling of a very large tree. The tree narrowly misses Chester who then begins chopping something off screen. A tint tree falls. He finds a normal sized tree marked with a white "X" for felling. His axe bounces off.

A girl appears, Hazel Wood, Bill tells Chester to keep away but Hazel likes Chester and tries to kiss him. Bill gets jealous. He tricks him into sitting on a large log on a log-slide but gets caught himself and dragged along behind. At the bottom Chester gets catapulted off, and lands perched on an upright log. Bill beats him up.

Chester arrives battered and bruised in a small logging town. Bill and Hazel are in a room discussing Chester. Chester enters and traps Bill in the centre of a sliding table. He leave with Hazel who then gets a job "at a higher salary and lower altitude" - as a cashier in a saloon. The boss says her new boyfriend, Chester, can have a job as a dishwasher. Harry hurries over and the saloon owner inspects him. He offers him a shot of spirits for luck. Hazel tells him to accept it.

After he gets up he goes to the kitchen to meet the cook who is chopping meat with a big cleaver. The cook also offers a shot of spirits for luck and Chester sits on the floor to drink it (in case he falls over again). The cook then gives him a huge pile of plates, 50 or more, to be washed. Chester struggles to lift the weight and they sway. The existing dishwasher drops a cup and breaks it. The cook beats him up. Chester decides to put the swaying plates back where they started but they continue to sway.

In the saloon a rough character asks a waiter when will he get his soup. He doesn't get the answer he wants and he punches the waiter launching him into the kitchen. Chester tips an oil lamp over and it lands in the soup. He is asked to wait and the rough character still wants his soup. Chester looks to camera and raises his eyebrows. He offers beans instead. Hazel sees the predicament and in front of the tough customer tells the boss that the waiter has six notches on his gun. The boss warns the tough guy that he had better eat whatever the waiter brings. However, the tough guy says he loves the soup - until he suddenly collapses and runs out.

Back in the kitchen the cook tastes the soup and sprays it back out, almost starting a fire. He finds the lamp in the soup and starts chasing Chester. A tin drops on the cooks head so he cannot see that a mule kicks him... he thinks it is Chester's punch. He begs for mercy and runs off. Everyone stands back from Chester who is given the nickname "The Crying Killer".

In a corner a poker game is going on. Chester is now the bouncer. Tough Mike is told to beware of him. Mike shows his shooting skills. Chester has objects in the room wired up to look as if he shoots them when he pulls a rope behind the door. He is impressing people then the dishwasher pulls all ropes at once as he fires. Tough Mike thinks he has a magic gun as it hit everything in the room at once. He examines the gun. He gets scared and runs off.

Big Bill comes in and sees Hazel. He punches the waiter who has tried to intervene. Chester comes up. Bill knocks his hat off and kicks him. Chester punches Bill and one other man in the ba, then the lights go off. A fight goes on in the dark and when the light returns only Chester is standing. He chalks up his victories on a chair. He gives Bill whiskey to revive him but when Bill pulls his gun he hits him with the bottle and walks off with Hazel.

Cast
see
Harry Langdon as Chester Winfield
Marie Astaire as Hazel Wood the Girl
Vernon Dent as Big Bill Reardon, the rival
Leo Willis as the Tough Cook
William McCal as the Saloon Owner
Barney Hellum as the Dishwasher
Leo Sulky as Tough Mike the customer

References
 

1925 films
Films produced by Mack Sennett
Films directed by Harry Edwards (director)